Inside Voices / Outside Voices is the fourth studio album by American singer, songwriter, and rapper K.Flay. The album was released on February 4, 2022 by BMG Rights Management, and includes tracks from K.Flay's previous Inside Voices and Outside Voices extended plays, in addition to two exclusive tracks, "The Muck" and "Good to Drive". On November 10, 2022, the album was released in the format of a vinyl LP. The two EPs and album received mainly positive reviews.

Inside Voices / Outside Voices spawned a thirteen-stop tour entitled The Inside Voices / Outside Voices Tour, which lasted from February 10, 2022, to April 9. In addition, a second month-long tour was announced, entitled K.Flay: Fall Tour, but was cancelled due to her then-recent diagnosis of sensorineural hearing loss and labyrinthitis.

In an interview with Alternative Press, repeated in The Stanford Daily, K.Flay explained that Inside Voices represents the id, while Outside Voices represents the ego, and that her thought process was "can I put together two bodies of work that represent these disparate parts of our psyche?"

Track listing

References 

2022 albums
K.Flay albums